Petroleum has been a major industry in the United States since shortly after the oil discovery in the Oil Creek area of Titusville, Pennsylvania in 1859. The industry includes exploration, production, processing (refining), transportation, and marketing of natural gas and petroleum products. In 2018, the U.S. became the worlds largest crude oil producer, producing 15% of global crude oil, surpassing Russia and Saudi Arabia. The leading oil-producing area in the United States in 2019 was Texas ( per day), followed by the offshore federal zone of the Gulf of Mexico ( per day), North Dakota ( per day) and New Mexico ( per day). In 2020, the top five U.S. oil producing states were Texas (43%), North Dakota (10.4%), New Mexico (9.2%), Oklahoma (4.1%), and Colorado (4.0%).

The oil industry extracted a record high 4.47 billion barrels of crude oil in the United States in 2019 (around 12.25 million barrels per day), worth an average wellhead price of US$55 per barrel. U.S. oil production was 2.5 times as high in 2019 as it was in 2008 (when it reached its lowest level since 1946).

US Natural gas production achieved new record highs for each year from 2011 through 2014. Marketed natural gas production in 2014 was 74.7 billion cubic feet per day, a 44% increase over the rate of 51.9 billion cubic feet per day in 2005. Over the same time period, production of natural gas liquids increased 70%, from 1.74 million barrels per day in 2005 to 2.96 million barrels per day in 2014. In April 2015, natural gas was produced at the rate of 79.4 billion cubic feet per day.

In 2014, petroleum and natural gas were the two largest sources of energy in the U.S., together providing 63 percent of the energy consumed (oil provided 35 percent and gas 28 percent). In 2020, the U.S. consumed about 18.19 million barrels per day, which was the lowest annual consumption rate since 1995. The cause of this decrease is largely attributed to the global response to the COVID-19 pandemic. Petroleum and Natural gas made up 35% and 34% of U.S. energy consumption in 2020.

In 2019, the U.S. imported 9% of the petroleum it used, the lowest since 1957. The largest sources of U.S. imported oil were: Canada (49%), Mexico (7%), Saudi Arabia (6%), Russia (6%), and Colombia (4%).

According to the American Petroleum Institute, the oil and natural gas industry supports nine million U.S. jobs and makes up seven percent of the nation's gross domestic product. As of 2021, the petroleum and natural gas industries support 10.3 million jobs and make up 8% of the U.S. GDP.

Industry structure

The United States oil industry is made up of thousands of companies, engaged in exploration and production, transportation, refining, distribution, and marketing of oil. The industry is often informally divided into "upstream" (exploration and production), "midstream" (transportation and refining), and "downstream" (distribution and marketing). The industry sector involved in oil exploration and production is for all practical purposes identical with the sector exploring and producing natural gas, but oil and natural gas have different midstream and downstream sectors (see: Natural gas in the United States).

Majors
The term major oil company has no formal definition, but usually refers to a large vertically integrated company, with operations in all or most of the industry phases, from  exploration to marketing. Many majors have international operations.

The largest of the majors are sometimes called supermajors. This term is often applied to BP, Shell, Exxon Mobil, Chevron, and Total, all of which operate in the US.

Independents  
An independent is a company which has all or almost all of its operations in a limited segment of the industry, such as exploration and production, refining, or marketing. Although most independents are small compared to the majors, there are some very large companies which are not vertically integrated, and so are classed as independents.

Service companies
Service companies contract to oil companies to perform specialized services. Examples are companies that do well logging (Schlumberger), seismic surveys (WesternGeco, CGG (company)), drilling (Nabors Industries, Helmerich & Payne), or well completion (Baker Hughes, Halliburton). There are innumerable small oil (craft oil) producers whose aggregate crude oil production exceeds the aggregate production of major crude oil companies.

In 2009, the production owned by the top ten companies was 52% of total US oil production.

Exploration
Exploratory drilling, and seismic exploration techniques disturb land and marine ecosystems. Alternative technologies are being adopted to minimize the number of exploratory wells being drilled. Satellites, remote-sensing devices, and 3-D/4-D seismic technologies are some of these technologies. Smaller “slimhole” drilling rigs are able to drill smaller exploratory wells to reduce the size of the impacted area.
Each year, tens of thousands of wells are drilled in search of oil and gas in the U.S.  In 2009, 36,243 wells were drilled.

Production

Top oil fields in the U.S.

Associated gas
Most modern oil fields are developed with plans to utilize both the oil and the associated gas.  Since oil is historically the higher value product, the gas may be viewed as a waste by-product when such plans are delayed, fail, or do not exist.  Depending on local regulations, the gas may  then be disposed of at the well site in practices known as gas venting and production flaring.   In the U.S., a growing volume and percentage of the produced associated gas is intentionally wasted in this way since about year 2000,  reaching nearly 50-year highs of 500 billion cubic feet and 7.5% in 2018.

Produced water
When extracting oil and gas from oil sands and shale oil, water that was present is extracted as well, which is called “produced water”. In 2017, an estimated 160 billion gallons of produced water was generated during U.S. shale oil and gas producing operations. Ongoing research seeks to identify safe ways to reuse produced water. The water is usually highly saline, and must be disposed of by injecting it into EPA-permitted Class II water disposal wells.

Some produced water contains sufficient lithium, iodine, etc to be recovered as a by-product.

Crude oil transportation and storage

The product extracted at the wellhead, usually a mixture of oil/condensate, gas, and water, goes through equipment on the lease to separate the three components. The oil and produced water are in most cases stored in separate tanks at the site, and periodically removed by truck. Over the decade 2005-2014, the volume of oil carried to the refinery by tanker ship has decreased. The oil volumes delivered to US refineries by all other modes has increased. Crude oil and petroleum products are transported mainly by pipelines, rail, or water via tanker ships. The U.S has more than 3 million miles of pipeline dedicated to the transportation of natural gas.

Pipeline
Most crude oil shipped long distances in the US goes by oil pipeline. In 2014, 58 percent of the petroleum arriving at refineries came by pipeline, up from 48 percent in 2005.  In 2014, the United States had 161 thousand miles of interstate oil pipelines, an increase of 29 thousand miles since 2005. The interstate pipelines are connected to 4.2 million miles of trunk oil pipelines. The top US oil pipeline companies in 2014 were, in order of decreasing interstate pipeline mileage: Magellan Pipeline Company, Mid-America Pipeline Company, and Plains All American Pipeline.

Water
Petroleum can be transported cheaply for long distances by oceangoing oil tankers.  Tankers supplied 31 percent of the oil arriving at US refineries in 2014, down from 48 percent in 2005; the decline reflects decreased oil imports since 2005.

For shorter-distance water transport, oil is shipped by barge, which accounted for 5.7 percent of oil arriving at refineries in 2014, up from 2.9 percent in 2005.

Truck
Most oil is initially carried off the site by tanker truck. The truck may take the oil directly to a nearby refinery. In 2014, 2.6 percent of oil arrived at refineries by truck, up from 2.6 percent in 2005. If  the refinery is not close, the tanker truck will take the crude oil to a pipeline, barge, or railroad for long-distance transport.

Railroad

Before the common availability of long-distance pipelines, most crude oil was shipped by rail. It is for this historical reason that in Texas, oil and gas production came to be regulated by the Texas Railroad Commission. Rail transport of crude oil has made a resurgence since 2005, largely due to the lack of pipeline capacity to transport the increased oil volumes from North Dakota. In 2014, 2.7 percent of crude oil arriving at refineries came by rail, up from 0.1 percent in 2005.

Since 2012, oil shipped by rail from the Bakken fields in North Dakota has progressively replaced overseas (non-Canadian) imported oil used by East Coast US refineries. In February 2015, railroads supplied 52 percent of all crude oil delivered to US refineries on the East Coast.

Storage

Crude oil is stored in oil terminals above ground, natural gas storage is primarily done underground. Private companies store oil and participate in the oil-storage trade to try and get the best deal on their oil. Governments also store oil in Strategic Petroleum Reserves to cope with Geopolitical /economic shocks.

Refining

The United States petroleum refining industry, the world’s largest, is most heavily concentrated along the Gulf Coast of Texas and Louisiana. In 2012, US refiners produced 18.5 million barrels per day of refined petroleum products. Of this amount, 15 percent was exported. As of 2012 the US was the world’s second largest net exporter of refined petroleum products.

Petroleum product distribution and marketing
Refined petroleum products destined for retail consumption is transferred to bulk terminals by pipeline, barge, or rail. From the bulk terminal, the product is usually trucked to the retail outlets.

As of February 2014, there were 153,000 service stations selling motor fuel in the US, including garages, truck stops, convenience stores, and marinas. Although many stations carry the brands of major integrated oil companies, only 2% of US stations are owned by major oil companies; most stations labeled with major brands are operated under franchise agreements. A total of 58% of the service stations are single-store operations run by an individual or family.

Price

Except for one, every US recession since World War II experienced a sharp increase in the price of oil. This correlation strongly signifies the US dependency of oil for the economy and oil's importance in US development for most of the time since the war. Many of the key cases of crude oil price increases in the post-war period were associated with political upheaval from oil rich countries. Domestic production and consumption were outpaced by US demand toward the late 1960s, and Middle Eastern nations gained a significant amount of political leverage in controlling prices based on their production. Price increases have been directly related to increased investment and subsequent oil production. After World War II, European reconstruction through the Marshall Plan was the primary objective of the American economy, and investment eventually rose after a long-term price increase at the end of the war. In the 1950s, there were strikes by oil workers, production restrictions imposed by the Texas Railroad Commission, as well as the Suez Crisis and Korean War—all creating steep price increases, with prices only falling after production could meet demand. Peak Oil in the US caused a definite decline of American reserves and several more strikes by oil workers. Additional singular events such as the OPEC embargo, the rupture of the Trans-Arabian Pipeline, and Iranian Nationalization of the oil industry resulted in further never-before-seen price increases. Each case was followed by a marked recession in the US economy.

In 2008, oil prices rose briefly, to as high as $145 per barrel, and U.S. gasoline prices jumped from $1.37 to $2.37 per gallon in 2005, causing a search for alternate sources, and by 2012, less than half the US oil consumption was imported. However, as of January 2015, the price of oil has decreased to around $50 per barrel. As of September 2021, the price per barrel of crude oil was $69.06.

Consumption and production

In the twentieth century, oil production became of more value, as the US industrialized and developed commercial transportation, such as railroads and motor vehicles. Furthermore, oil consumption also increased because of electricity. After electricity, oil became more important in commercial, manufacturing, and residential sectors such as heating and cooking. Therefore, during this period, the growth of oil consumption indicates that the US was becoming dependent on oil and that it helped the domestic oil industry to grow. However, U.S oil domestic production could not cover the growing demand in the nation's market, which allowed the U.S. to look for a new supply internationally.

The nation's consumption of oil increased 53% between 1915 and 1919, followed by another increase of 27% in 1920. The first shock of the transportation era occurred in 1920 and lasted for about a year. The shortage of oil devastated the entire West Coast with hour-long lines for gasoline. Also, in many places, fuel was not available for at least a week. Finally, big production from Texas, California, and Oklahoma took the shortage of oil away, causing oil prices to fall 40% between 1920 and 1926. During the Great Depression, both growing supply and falling demand caused the price of oil to decrease to about 66% between 1926 and 1931.

Toward the end of World War II, the automotive era settled rapidly, and the nation's demand of oil increased 12% between 1945 and 1947 while motor vehicle registrations did so by 22%. Around 1948, demand of oil exceeded the supply of oil, allowing the U.S. to start importing oil. Therefore, the nation quickly became a major importer of oil, rather than being the major exporter for it.

In 1952, due to a strike by US oil refinery workers, both the US and the United Kingdom cut 30% of fuel delivery to civilian flights, while Canada postponed all private flights. Until the 1960s, the price of oil was relatively stable, and the world market could cover the excess demand of oil in the U.S. However, in 1973, the price of oil increased due to the Arab oil embargo against the U.S., following the nation's support of Israel in the Yom Kippur War. During that time, Arab oil producers reduced production by 4.4mb/d for two months, 7.5% of global output. During this time, people reduced their consumption of oil by turning down thermostats and carpooling to work, which together with the lower demand due to the 1973-75 recession, resulted in a reduction in oil consumption.

After the oil crisis of 1973, the price of oil increased again between 1979 and 1980 due to the Iranian revolution. This crisis was related to political instability in a major oil-exporting region. During this period, oil consumption decreased because of new efficiency. At that time, cars were developed so less oil was required and industrialization was also advanced to reduce oil consumption. This caused a decline in U.S. demand of oil and reduced the amount of international imports. The last energy crises in the U.S occurred in 1990. This occurred due to Iraq's invasion of Kuwait. Similar to the previous crisis, price of oil increased and oil consumption decreased but by a smaller amount and had a smaller effect.

In 2010, 70.5% of petroleum consumption in the U.S. was for transportation. Approximately 2/3 of transportation consumption was gasoline. Today, the U.S is still dependent on oil, as oil plays an important role socially, economically, and politically.

In May 2019, the United States produced a record 12.5 million barrels of oil per day and it is expected to reach to a record 13.4 million barrels per day by the end of 2019.

In 2020, U.S. refineries produced about 18.375 million barrels of petroleum products per day. Crude oil making up 11.283 million barrels, natural gas liquids making up 5.175 million barrels, and other petroleum products making up the rest.

Policy
Regulation of the oil market has played a major role in the substance's history. Policies affect the market in several ways, such as price, production, consumption, supply and demand. The oil market has had a history of booms and troughs, which have caused producers to demand government intervention. Usually, this government involvement only made the situation worse. Furthermore, many of the regulations were quickly ruled illegal and removed. Prior to World War II, many of the issues within the oil market had to do to with changing prices. During the 1920s, oil prices were beginning peaking fears of oil depletion. In response to these fears, during Coolidge's administration, U.S. Congress enacted a depletion allowance to producers which led to a surge of investment in the oil business and the discovery of many new, large oil reservoirs. The next decade featured falling prices caused by the new investment and overproduction. The declining prices allowed producers to demand a price support system. For example, the way prices were propped up was a pro-rationing order made by the Railroad Commission of Texas, which restricted oil production and increased price. This order was soon ruled illegal by federal district court in 1931. The 1930s marked the beginning of large federal intervention in the oil industry and began by creating the National Industrial Recovery Act in 1933, which allowed for natural price competition, instead of agreements between the major producers. However, this act was ruled unconstitutional a year later.

While the time before World War II was filled with issues regarding price, the post-war era had increasing oil imports partly due to the price support established between the 1920s and '30s. The artificially high domestic prices caused a surge of imports from lower priced foreign producers. In 1955, a clause was added to the Reciprocal Trade Act Amendments, which gave the president the power to limit imports of a specific commodity, if that particular commodity was harmful to the nation's security. This clause allowed President Eisenhower to enact oil import quotas in 1959, which ultimately allowed international oil prices to decline. These import quotas restricted international oil companies from the US market, and allowed them to form the OPEC. During the 1970s, President Nixon put many phases of price controls into place. After many new regulations altering the original price control system, President Carter eventually began removing these controls in 1979. During his administration, in response to an energy crisis and hostile Iranian and Soviet Union relations, President Carter announced the Carter Doctrine, which declared that any interference with the nation's interests in the Persian Gulf would be considered an attack on its vital interests. Ronald Reagan later expanded this doctrine. Since the 1990s, the oil market has been free of most regulations.

Near the end of 2015 President Barack Obama signed a spending bill lifting a four decade ban on exports of crude oil.

On March 24, 2017 the Trump administration issued a presidential permit to allow construction of the Keystone XL pipeline. In June 2017, President Donald Trump announced his intention to withdraw the U.S. from the Paris Agreement. Although under Article 28 of the Paris Agreement the U.S. could not officially withdraw from until 2020. In his announcement the President stated “as of today, the United States will cease all implementation of the Paris Agreement”. On August 17, 2020 the Trump Administration opened the Arctic National Wildlife Refuge to oil exploitation.

In 2021, President Joe Biden rejoined the Paris Agreement and closed the Arctic National Wildlife Refuge to oil exploitation. On January 20, 2021 The Biden Administration revoked the permits for construction of the Keystone XL pipeline.

During the 2020 Russia–Saudi Arabia oil price war, the Texas Railroad Commission again discussed pro-rationing to keep oil prices at a level suitable for US producers. Texas ordinarily produces 5.3 million barrels per day, and the US maximum production is 13 million.

History

Although some oil was produced commercially before 1859 as a byproduct from salt brine wells, the American oil industry started on a major scale with the discovery of oil at the Drake Well in western Pennsylvania in 1859.

Pennsylvanian oil rush
Office of Naval Petroleum and Oil Shale Reserves
Petroleum Administration for Defense District
Texas wildcatters
Oil Capital of the World

Statistics
The Energy Information Administration of the United States Department of Energy publishes extensive statistics on the production, importation, and uses of petroleum in the United States.

In 1913, the United States was extracting 65 percent of the world's petroleum.. In 1989, the United States contained 5 percent of the world's oil reserves.  In 2022, New Mexico produced more oil than Mexico.

Politics

In 2007, state severance taxes amounted to $10.7 billion, mostly from oil, gas, and coal. States also received 50 percent of federal onshore oil and gas lease revenues within their borders, and 27 percent of federal offshore oil and gas revenues adjacent to their shorelines; the state share of federal revenues totalled $2.0 billion in 2007.

Environmental issues
In 1985, the National Artificial Reef Plan was developed and the Rigs-to-Reefs policy was enacted. Since 2020, 558 off-shore oil platforms have been retired, cleaned up, and tipped over to be reefed in the Gulf of Mexico. These platforms provide as much as 3 acres of habitat for hundreds of marine species.

Routine flaring
Oil spill
Arctic Refuge drilling controversy

Organizations
American Association of Petroleum Geologists
 American Petroleum Institute
Nevada Petroleum Society

See also

Energy conservation in the United States
Energy in the United States
Energy policy of the United States
History of the petroleum industry in the United States
Natural gas in the United States
Offshore oil and gas in the United States
The Petroleum Dictionary (book)
Shale gas in the United States

By State:
California
Ohio
Oklahoma

References

External links

Interactive United States energy comparisons

 
Petroleum industry in the United States